Mounds is a candy bar made by The Hershey Company, consisting of shredded, sweetened coconut coated in dark chocolate. The company also produces the Almond Joy, a similar bar topped by whole almonds and covered in milk chocolate. The two products share common packaging and logo design, with Mounds using a red color scheme and Almond Joy blue.

History 
Originally invented by candy maker Vincent Nitido of West Haven, Connecticut, Mounds was created in 1920 as a single piece for 5 cents. In 1929, the Peter Paul Candy Manufacturing Company purchased the line and began production. The format changed to two pieces that still sold for 5 cents, with the price rising to 10 cents after World War II. Mounds was made in milk chocolate as well.

During World War II, Peter Paul was faced with severe shortages of sugar and coconut which had been shipped from the Philippines before war broke out. The company instead began sourcing coconut from the Caribbean using its own fleet of small vessels for transportation of coconut supplies to the United States. Nicknamed the "Flea Fleet", these seven ships were small enough to avoid detailed scrutiny by German naval war vessels operating in the Caribbean and yet carried sufficient supply of coconut to keep Peter Paul in operation during the war.  Rather than sacrifice quality, the company discontinued some of its lesser selling brands and concentrated production on the Mounds candy bar. Over the years, Peter Paul added several products to its line, including the Almond Joy candy bar (1946) and York Peppermint Patties (1940).
Cadbury and Peter Paul merged in 1978, and Hershey Foods purchased the company's U.S. operations in 1988.

Mounds, Almond Joy and other Peter Paul confections, were manufactured in Naugatuck, Connecticut, from the early 1920s until 2007.  In 1950, Peter Paul Candy Manufacturing Company built a larger plant in Naugatuck to produce its confections.  Following its acquisition of Mounds and Almond Joy in 1988, The Hershey Company continued to manufacture Mounds and Almond Joy at the Peter Paul plant, before moving the manufacturing operation to a more modern plant in Stuarts Draft, Virginia, in 2007. At the time of the move, the 250,000 square foot Naugatuck plant was operating at 40% capacity.

A limited-edition Mounds Island Orange candy bar was introduced in 2006 with orange-colored and orange-flavored coconut but did not last long.

Advertising 
Mounds' original slogan, "Indescribably Delicious", was created when Mounds ran a contest to come up with the best two words to sell the candy.  Leon Weiss, who came up with the slogan, won $10.  Peter Paul, Inc. filed a trademark application for the phrase on February 20, 1964, claiming a date of first use on June 15, 1956.  The trademark registration date was August 3, 1965.  Mounds continues to use the slogan in advertising and on the wrapper.

Mounds uses a packaging and logo design similar to its sister product, with Almond Joy's blue replaced by red, and the two candies are often advertised together. The candy's 1970s ad campaign used a jingle, "Sometimes you feel like a nut / sometimes you don't / Almond Joy's got nuts / Mounds don't", written by Leon Carr and Leo Corday, sung by Joey Levine.

See also 
Bounty, a similar product manufactured by Mars, Incorporated

References

External links 
 

 

Chocolate bars
The Hershey Company brands
Products introduced in 1920
Brand name confectionery
Foods containing coconut
Kosher food
Candy